Pyo Yeong-jae (born October 17, 1972) is a South Korean voice actor who joined the Munhwa Broadcasting Corporation's Voice Acting Division in 1999.

Roles

Broadcast TV
CSI: Miami (replacing Adam Rodriguez by Season 1 and Jonathan Togo by Season 3, Korea TV Edition, MBC)
Dr. Slump (Korea TV Edition, MBC)
Midnight Special (MBC)

Video game dubbing
Samurai Warriors (Mitsuhide Akechi)
The War of Genesis Mobile: Crow II
League of Legends (Jhin, Varus)
Genshin Impact (Zhongli)
MapleStory (Male Kain, Gilmore, Tirag)
Cookie Run: Kingdom (Red Velvet Cookie)
Arknights (Phantom)

Movie dubbing
The Fast and The Furious (replacing Rick Yune, Korea TV Edition, MBC)
The Others (2001 film) (replacing Eric Sykes, Korea TV Edition, MBC)
Star Wars (replacing Mark Hamill, Korea TV Edition, MBC) (Korean Re-Dub) (Original Korean voice: Bak Ki Ryang)

See also
Munhwa Broadcasting Corporation
MBC Voice Acting Division

External links
Daum Cafe Voice Actor Pyo Yeong Jae Homepage (in Korean)
MBC Voice Acting division Pyo Yeong Jae blog (in Korean)

1972 births
Living people
South Korean male voice actors
Male video game actors